Independence Flagstaff, also known as the Charles F. Murphy Memorial Flagpole, is an outdoor memorial by sculptor Anthony de Francisci, located in Union Square Park in Manhattan, New York, which commemorates the 150th anniversary of the signing of the United States Declaration of Independence. The memorial was cast in 1926 and dedicated on July 4, 1930. It was made of steel, with copper sheathing, and is set on a granite pedestal which includes bronze bas-reliefs and plaques. The monument is in axial alignment with Henry Kirke Brown's statues of George Washington and Abraham Lincoln.

References

1930 establishments in New York City
1930 sculptures
Flagpoles
Monuments and memorials in Manhattan
Outdoor sculptures in Manhattan
Steel sculptures in New York City
Union Square, Manhattan